Glycerol phenylbutyrate (USAN), trade name  Ravicti, is a medication used in the treatment of certain inborn urea cycle disorders. The medication works by preventing the harmful buildup of ammonia in the body. It is an FDA-approved prescription drug in the US. It is approved for anyone over 2 months of age. It was developed by Hyperion Therapeutics based on the existing drug Buphenyl, and received approval on February 1, 2013. Hyperion has been criticized for setting a high price for the drug. The price was set at US$250,000–290,000. In 2014, the drug generated $30.8 million in net sales, far behind the older and less expensive Buphenyl ($113.6 million in sales). In March 2015, Horizon Pharma acquired Hyperion Therapeutics and thus Raviciti.

References

External links 
 

CYP2D6 inhibitors
Prodrugs